Dil Shahjahanpuri (1875-1959), was the takhallus of Zameer Hasan Khan, the renowned Urdu ghazal writer, who was born in Shahjahanpur, North Western Provinces, British India in the year 1875. He was a disciple of the famous Urdu poet, Amir Meenai. Thus far, two collections of his ghazals have been published; they are – Naghma e Dil and Tarana e Dil. Dil Shahjahanpuri, hayat aur adabi khidmat by Izhar Sahbai published in 1988 by Taqsimkar, Danish Mahall, Lucknow, (DLC)88905477  is the only known exhaustive work on the life and literary contribution of this poet. He died in Shahjahanpur in 1959.

References

Urdu-language poets from India
Indian male poets
1875 births
1959 deaths
20th-century Indian poets
Poets from Uttar Pradesh
20th-century Indian male writers
People from Shahjahanpur
Poets in British India